Mount Eliza is a hill that overlooks the city of Perth, Western Australia and forms part of Kings Park.

As part of Kings Park, Mount Eliza has received more than 5 million visitors each year (2019), due to events such as; the Anzac Day Memorial service, the Australia Day fireworks and the Kings Park festival. In addition to these events, Mount Eliza attracts visitors and interest with its ecosystems, indigenous and colonial history, landmarks and other activities.

Naming 

In 1827, James Stirling of  inspected the Swan River for potential future colonisation. In this expedition it is said that Mount Eliza was named after the wife of New South Wales Governor Darling. In July 1901, Perth Park was renamed to 'The Kings Park' honouring the new King Edward VII.

Geography

Geology 
Geologically, Mount Eliza is part of the Spearwood Dunal system which were formed during the Pleistocene glacial and interglacial periods around 40,000 years ago. This system is identifiable by its yellow brown sands over Tamala limestone. Mount Eliza's soil is of the Karrakatta soil association, formed from calcareous beach sand containing 50–70% calcium carbonate. The leaching of this carbonate over time has created the limestone bases which have been exposed as the Swan River has receded. A drilling survey in 1971 found that both the escarpment and tableland area had a diverse nature of sand grain, depth and overall fertility. This diversity of sand sheets is explained by the operation of Aeolian deposition and erosion over extended periods of time. Underlying sand loam sheets, with perched water tables are considered highly important for vegetation growth and subsequent stabilisation. The Botanic Gardens and Parks Authority (BGPA) manages risk associated with geotechnical instability, and between 1995 and 2020 has made two geotechnical inspections with no major concerns.

Flora 

Within Mount Eliza's tableland and escarpment area there are 326 species of local native plants growing, which represents close to 15% of the native flora in the Perth region. Within this, 3 major plant communities are supported; limestone health land, banksia woodland and low moist areas.

Prior to European settlement, the bushland would have been dominated by tall Tuart (eucalyptus gomphocephala), Jarrah (Eucalyptus marginata) and Marri (Corymbia calophylla) with Banksia species sub-dominating. Today the bushland is dominated by Banksia species, and the original ecosystem of tall open forest of tuart-jarrah-marri is likely collapsing to be replaced by Banksia and low woodlands. This is a natural sequence, yet some say it has been accelerated by disturbance from settlement.

Over 265 presumed species of macro fungi have been identified within the King Park's bushland, and almost all of these species are considered to be indigenous to the area.

Fauna 
Kings Park has a wide variety of local birds and invertebrates, with over seventy bird species, twenty reptile species and hundreds of different invertebrates within the bushland of Mount Eliza.

Kings Park and the Mount Eliza escarpment has been subject to various long-term studies on urban avifauna. A study in 1996 found that the Brown Honeyeater and Red Wattlebird were the two most abundant birds in the Mount Eliza escarpment. In addition, the study found that there was a higher abundance of birds, specifically nectivores during the spring season, likely due to the flowering plants. Despite this increase, there was a relatively small amount of nectivores in the Mount Eliza escarpment compared to other regions studied. Furthermore, a study in 2013 found that the 3 most abundant species in the bushland surrounding Mount Eliza were the Brown Honeyeater, Singing Honeyeater and Red Wattlebird.

Invertebrates of significant conservation value such as the Scarp Snail and the trapdoor spider are confined to the Mount Eliza escarpment of Kings Park.

History

Aboriginal

Dreamtime 
The Waugal is the major spirit for Noongar people and is a Rainbow Serpent, a snakelike Dreamtime creature, recognised as the giver of life.  is a site of great Aboriginal significance at the foot of Mount Eliza as it is believed when the Waugal created the Swan River,  served as its resting place.

Colonial interactions 
In 1834, the sacred site  was set aside as a teaching camp for native tribes. A different source proposes that due to escalating violence between the settlers and the Noongar people it was considered expedient to provide the land to local people. By mid-1830s the Mount Eliza Native Institution was providing supplies to around 50 Noongar people, however by 1838 most of the Noongar population had either died or moved away from the area. Shortly after this movement, legislation was put in place which forbade Aboriginal people to enter the city of Perth without written permission and was only repealed in 1954.

Colonisation (1827–1900) 
Captain James Stirling, Commander of the HMS Success inspected the Swan River in 1827 hoping to establish a future colony. Climbing the peak of Mount Eliza, it is said he commented that the surround country, meandering river and distant mountains are 'particularly grand'.

Noongar elder Yellegonga supposedly accepted the newcomers as Stirling founded the Colony of Western Australia at Perth on 1 June 1829.

In 1832, Surveyor General John Septimus Roe refused permission to cut timber on Mount Eliza and indicated it should be reserved for public purposes.

In 1896, the upper levels of lots along the Mount Eliza scarp were resumed to Perth park, later named Kings Park.

Land usage

Tourism 
A variety of Kings Park tourist activities are interlinked with Mount Eliza such as Aboriginal cultural experiences, guided walks, walkways and overall sightseeing.

LotteryWest Federation Walkway 
Since opening in 2003, the  elevated steel and glass bridge is one of Kings Park most notable tourist attractions. It is said that Mount Eliza performs a mediating role between the city and the bushland of Kings Park, and Federation Walkway is intended to allow visitors to appreciate this distinction and appreciate the heritage of the landscape. Local Noongar artwork is incorporated in the design of the walkway with metal drawings into the bridge and a tiered performance area at the end of the walkway named Beedawong.

Beedawong 
Beedawong meaning 'celebration' or 'meeting place' is a stone amphitheatre located on the tableland area of Mount Eliza, west of Federation Walkway. The venue was constructed in 2003 to provide a place for ongoing Noongar cultural activities and visitor activities.

Memorials 

The Western Australian War Memorial is situated at the peak of Mount Eliza and was unveiled on 24 November 1929 by the State Governor Sir William Campion. It can be described as a granite obelisk (cenotaph) surrounded by loggia in which the names of those who died in or out of service are inscribed. In addition to the Cenotaph, the memorial precinct in Kings Park includes the court of contemplation, flame of remembrance and pool of reflection. The Cenotaph includes names of more than 7,000 members of service. This memorial receives more than 40,000 visitors each year during the Anzac Day Dawn Service.

Reservoir 

In 1895,  of land was excised from the public park land which was then titled 'public park Mt Eliza'. Construction of Mount Eliza reservoir for Perth's Water supply was then commenced on this land. 1896 was a period of rapid population growth in Perth which resulted in a strain on the city's water supply. It is said that some households in Perth went without water for days since the path connecting to the Mount Eliza reservoir was too small. This original reservoir was demolished in 1935 to make way for new reservoirs which remain a key component in Perth's water supply system. In 1934 ponds 1 and 2 were incorporated to provide  of water. Mount Eliza is a service reservoir which supports the greater functioning of the Victoria reservoir.

References

External links 
 

Landmarks in Perth, Western Australia
Kings Park, Western Australia